Rose apple may refer to:
 Angophora costata, a common woodland and forest tree of Eastern Australia
 Various Syzygium species, especially the following:
Syzygium aqueum, Watery rose apple
Syzygium jambos, Rose apple or jamb
Syzygium malaccense, Malay rose apple
Syzygium samarangense, Java rose apple

Parasites 
Rose apples are one of the most common hosts for fruit flies like A. suspensa, which will lay their eggs in overripe or spoiled rose apples. The larvae of these flies will then consume the fruit in order to gain nutrients until they can proceed into the pupa stage. This parasitism has led to millions in economic costs for nations in Central America.

References